The Center for Constitutional Rights has coordinated efforts by American lawyers to handle the habeas corpus, and other legal appeals, of several hundred of the Guantanamo detainees.

Only American lawyers have been allowed to visit detainees at the Guantanamo Bay detention camps, in Cuba.  They have to go through security screening first.  And they must agree that they can't speak from the notes they took during their meetings with their clients until they have been cleared for release.

Complaints from the detainees' attorneys
 Many of the lawyers have repeated claims that their clients have been abused, and are receiving inhumane treatment.
 Lawyers have reported that it was hard to establish trust with their clients, because:
 Guantanamo guards had warned them that the lawyers were either Jews or homosexuals.
 Guantanamo interrogators had previously used the interrogation technique "false flag", and represented themselves as their lawyers, in attempts to get the captives to divulge information they had withheld during their interrogations.
 Lawyers reported that the DoD had interfered with their ability to meet with their clients, telling them that they weren't spelling their names correctly.
 Lawyers reported that the DoD interfered with their ability to meet with their clients by both refusing to provide a government translator, and raising bogus national security concerns about the translators they proposed.
 The body that reviewed their notes, before they were able to consult them, was arbitrarily classifying their notes, so they couldn't consult them.  Omar Khadr's lawyer Muneer Ahmad found, on his first visit to the secure centre which is the only place where the lawyers can review their notes, that almost the entire twenty pages of notes he took when he first met Khadr had been classified above his level of security clearance.

However, an Army investigation found these charges unfounded.
US Department of Defense spokesmen state “It is our policy to in no way interfere with legal counsel.”

The Department of Defense maintains that "they see evidence of the al Qaeda-directed misinformation campaign in allegations of detainee abuse and mishandling of the Koran at Guantanamo Bay."

Guantanamo detainees' defense attorneys

Firms and institutions represented

 John Adams Project
 Allen & Overy
 Baker & McKenzie
 Bingham McCutchen
 Blank Rome
 Bondurant, Mixson & Elmore
 Burns & Levinson
 Center for Constitutional Rights
 Cleary Gottlieb Steen & Hamilton
 Clifford Chance
 Cohen Milstein
 Covington & Burling
 Davis Wright Tremaine
 Debevoise & Plimpton
 Dechert
 Dickstein Shapiro
 Dorsey & Whitney
 Fredrikson & Byron
 Freedman Boyd Hollander Goldberg & Ives
 Fulbright & Jaworski
 Garvey Schubert Barer
 Gibbons, Del Deo, Dolan, Griffinger & Vecchione
 Holland & Hart
 Hunton & Williams
 Jenner & Block
 King & Spalding
 Kramer Levin Naftalis & Frankel
 Mayer Brown
 McCarter & English
 Nixon Peabody
 Northwestern University School of Law
 Paul, Weiss, Rifkind, Wharton & Garrison
 Pepper Hamilton
 Perkins Coie
 Pillsbury Winthrop Shaw Pittman
 Reed Smith
 Reprieve
 Richards Spears Kibbe & Orbe
 Schiff Hardin
 Schnader Harrison Segal & Lewis
 Schwabe, Williamson & Wyatt
 Seton Hall University School of Law
 Shearman & Sterling
 Shook, Hardy & Bacon
 Sutherland Asbill & Brennan
 Venable
 Weil, Gotshal & Manges
 Willkie Farr & Gallagher
 Wilmer Cutler Pickering Hale and Dorr

References

External links
 Gitmo's Indefensible Lawyers by Debra Burlingame and Thomas Joscelyn

 
Criminal defense lawyers